William Henry Sharp (27 August 1915 – 6 May 2006) was an Australian rules footballer who played with St Kilda and North Melbourne in the Victorian Football League (VFL).

Sharp's football career was interrupted by his service in the Royal Australian Air Force during the Second World War.

Notes

External links 

Bill Sharp's playing statistics from The VFA Project

1915 births
2006 deaths
Australian rules footballers from Melbourne
Sandringham Football Club players
St Kilda Football Club players
North Melbourne Football Club players
People from St Kilda, Victoria
Royal Australian Air Force personnel of World War II
Military personnel from Melbourne